A national second tier of English league football was established in 1892–93, at the demise of Football Alliance, as the Second Division. In 1992, with the departure of the then First Division clubs to become the Premier League, the second tier became known as the First Division. In 2004 it was re-branded as the Football League Championship before it was renamed the EFL Championship in 2016.

Football League Second Division (1893–1992)
 Team marked with an asterisk (*) was not promoted

Football League First Division (1992–2004)

Football League Championship/EFL Championship (2004 onwards)

Number of titles overall
Clubs in bold are competing in the 2022–23 EFL Championship.

References

Football League Second Division
EFL Championship
EFL winners